Lawrence James McNamara (August 5, 1928 – December 17, 2004) was an American prelate of the Roman Catholic Church. He served as bishop of the Diocese of Grand Island in Nebraska from 1978 to 2004.

Biography

Early life
McNamara was born on August 5, 1928, in Chicago, Illinois.  He attended Archbishop Quigley Preparatory Seminary in Chicago,  then went to St. Paul Seminary in Saint Paul, Minnesota.  McNamara finished his education at the Catholic University of America in Washington, D.C., where he earned a degree in theology.

Priesthood 
McNamara was ordained a priest of the Diocese of Kansas City-St. Joseph, Missouri, on May 30, 1953. He also held an honorary degree of Doctor of Laws from Benedictine College in Atchison, Kansas.McNamara held numerous diocesan and civic posts in the Kansas City area. He was a parish priest and high school teacher, diocesan refugee resettlement director, chair of the United Campaign Agency Executives Association, chaplain of Jackson County Jail, and president of the Kansas City Citizens' Alliance for the War on Poverty. He was also a board member of the Human Resources Commission of Kansas City, the State Committee on Aging, and the Jackson County Civil Rights Commission and was moderator of the diocesan Family Life Bureau.

McNamara was known for his work in reorganizing and enlarging the scope of the Catholic Charities of the diocese. Under his direction of the agency (1957-1969), its efforts expanded to include programs in job opportunity training, remedial and adult basic education, tutoring for children in both Catholic and public schools, medically related services, family enrichment and pre-Cana programs, services to the elderly and housing programs.  His agency sponsored the first Out of School Neighborhood Youth Corps Program in Kansas City. He also sponsored a community action program through the Office of Economic Opportunity to provide social work service to adolescent youth and teenage gangs, and a program for the training of unemployed adults.

McNamara served as chairman of the National Conference of Catholic Charities Commission on Housing from 1969 to 1972. He was the diocesan director for Catholic Relief Services (CRS), the overseas aid agency of American Catholics. In the latter capacity, he was sent in 1970 on a visitation of CRS programs in West Africa. He was appointed executive director of the Campaign for Human Development, United States Catholic Conference, in 1973 and served in that capacity for some five years.

Bishop of Grand Island
On January 10, 1978, McNamara was appointed the sixth bishop of the Diocese of Grand Island by Pope Paul VI. He received his episcopal consecration on March 28, 1978, from Archbishop Daniel Sheehan, with Bishops Charles Helmsing and John Sullivan serving as co-consecrators.

Subsequent to his ordination as bishop, he served as president of the National Catholic Rural Life Conference (1980-1983), president of the National Council of Catholic Bishops' Committees for Liaison with Women Religious, the American Board of Catholic Missions, Campaign for Human Development (and National Episcopal Advisor for the Society of Saint Vincent de Paul in the United States). In his later years, he served as director of Catholic Relief Services; however, he stepped down in 1997 after African American staff members became outraged by his use of a racial slur.

After reaching the mandatory retirement age of 75, McNamara resigned as Bishop of Grand Island on October 14, 2004. He died two months later, aged 76.

See also

 Catholic Church hierarchy
 Catholic Church in the United States
 Historical list of the Catholic bishops of the United States
 List of the Catholic bishops of the United States
 Lists of patriarchs, archbishops, and bishops

References

External links
 Diocese of Grand Island

1928 births
2004 deaths
20th-century Roman Catholic bishops in the United States
21st-century Roman Catholic bishops in the United States
Clergy from Chicago
Roman Catholic bishops of Grand Island
Roman Catholic Diocese of Kansas City–Saint Joseph
University of St. Thomas (Minnesota) alumni
Catholic University of America alumni
Catholics from Illinois